Gabriel Wilfrid Stephen Brodsky (born 19 November 1933) is a research scholar and author in Literature of War and in Joseph Conrad studies.

Life
G. W. Stephen Brodsky is a literary research scholar and author. Formerly a career soldier, he joined the Canadian Army Reserves in 1949, aged fifteen, as a boy drummer. He subsequently served 1951–83 in regular army paratroop and conventional units of the Canadian Infantry, retiring in the rank of major. He saw tours of duty with NATO in West Germany, as a UN Peacekeeper in Cyprus and Kashmir, and as an instructor of officers.

Brodsky holds a BA (Queen's University, Canada), MA (University of Victoria, Canada) in Renaissance Literature and Drama, and DPhil (PhD) (University of York, UK) in Modern Literature with specialist studies in the works of Joseph Conrad. As a military professor on the academic faculty of Royal Roads Military College (RRMC), Victoria, Canada, he taught military ethics and Literature, and subsequently was a civilian Special Lecturer on Literature of War at RRMC.

A former trustee of the Joseph Conrad Society of America (2012–14),   Brodsky writes and publishes literary criticism and reviews.

Bibliography
 G. W. Stephen Brodsky, Gentlemen of the Blade: A Social and Literary History of the British Army Since 1660, Westport, Connecticut, Greenwood / Praeger, 1988. .
William J. Patterson, A Regiment Worthy of Its Hire: The Canadian Guards 1953-1970. ed. G. W. Stephen Brodsky, The Canadian Guards Association,1991,ff. 
G. W. Stephen Brodsky, (1) "Conrad's Darkness Visible": Occidental Orientalism and the Exotic in the Malay Tales".(2) Elmar Schenkel, "Fusspuren", G. W. Stephen Brodsky, Trans. and Commentary,in Zwischen Ost und West: Joseph Conrad im Europaischen Gesprache, ed. Elmar Schenkel, Hans-Christian Trepte, Schriftenreihe der Societas Jablonoviana, vol. 2, Leipzig UP, 209-239, 2019..
G. W. Stephen Brodsky, God's Dodger: The Story of a Front Line Chaplain, Sydney, Canada, Elysium, 1993, .
G. W. Stephen Brodsky, Joseph Conrad's Polish Soul: Realms of Memory and Self, edited by George Z. Gasyna (Conrad: Eastern and Western Perspectives Series, vol. 25), Lublin, Maria Curie Skłodowska University Press / New York, Columbia University Press, 2016, 409 pp., .
John R. Bishop with G. W. Stephen Brodsky (co-author, introd., ed.), The King's Bishop: A Canadian Corporal in Korea, 1950–51, Duncan, BC:Mossy Knoll, 2000. .

References 

Living people
1933 births
Alumni of the University of York
Canadian Army soldiers
Male non-fiction writers
Nationality missing
NATO military personnel
Place of birth missing (living people)
Queen's University at Kingston alumni
United Nations military personnel
University of Victoria alumni